Anopheles (Cellia) vagus is a species complex of zoophilic mosquito belonging to the genus Anopheles. It is found in India, Sri Lanka and Indonesia. It is a potential natural vector of malarial parasite Plasmodium falciparum, and Japanese encephalitis virus. It is highly susceptible to insecticide deltamethrin and resistant to DDT.

References

External links
Anopheline (Diptera: Culicidae) Breeding in a Traditional Tank-Based Village Ecosystem in North Central Sri Lanka
Physico-chemical characteristics of mosquito breeding habitats in an irrigation development area in Sri Lanka
Larval Survey of Surface Water-Breeding Mosquitoes During Irrigation Development in the Mahaweli Project, Sri Lanka
LARVAL HABITATS OF MALARIA VECTORS AND OTHER ANOPHELES MOSQUITOES AROUND A TRANSMISSION FOCUS IN NORTHWESTERN THAILAND

vagus
Insects described in 1902